The Qing dynasty developed a complicated system of ranks and titles. Princess's consort was granted a title of efu (Manchu:ᡝᡶᡠ ;; éfù), meaning "imperial charioter". However, the title was not granted to the spouses of clanswoman (untitled princesses or daughters of low-ranking clansmen). An efu retained his title and privileges as long as the princess remained his primary spouse – even after her death. However, if an efu remarried or promoted another consort to be his primary spouse, he lost all rights obtained from his marriage to the princess.

The following alphabetical lists contains the efus recorded in the imperial genealogy. However, not all efus are mentioned because daughters of princes not adopted into the palace were not recorded in genealogy of the Aisin Gioro clan.

Ranks of efus

List of princes consorts by the direct emperor's daughters 
The list is constructed according to the imperial princesses being daughters of emperors and clans of the princes consorts.

Daughters of Taksi

Daughters of Nurhaci

Biological daughters

Adopted daughters and granddaughters

Daughters of Hong Taiji

Biological daughters

Adopted daughters

Daughters of the Shunzhi Emperor

Biological daughter

Adopted daughters

Daughters of the Kangxi Emperor

Biological daughters

Adoptive daughters and granddaughters

Daughters of the Yongzheng Emperor

Biological daughters

Adopted daughters

Daughters of the Qianlong Emperor

Biological daughters

Adopted daughters

Daughters of the Jiaqing Emperor

Daughters of the Daoguang Emperor

Daughters of the Xianfeng Emperor

Biological daughters

Adoptive daughters

Lists of princes consorts by the imperial princes being the direct descendants of the emperors
The following list is created according to the imperial sons and their descendants. Please note, that not all princesses are included  because of insufficient data in imperial records. The princesses adopted as emperor's daughters are not included.

Sons of Taksi

Descendants of Šurhaci

Sons of Nurhaci

Prince Guanglue of the Third Rank

Prince Li of the First Rank/Prince Xun of the First Rank/Prince Kang of the First Rank

Cadet lines

Prince An of the First Rank / Prince Raoyu of the First Rank

Prince Ying of the First Rank

Prince Yu of the First Rank

Sons of Hong Taiji

Prince Su

Descendants of Yebushu

Prince Zhuang

Sons of the Shunzhi Emperor

Sons of the Kangxi Emperor

Prince Zhi of the Second Rank

Prince Li of the First Rank, line of Yunreng

Prince Cheng of the Second Rank

Prince Heng of the First Rank

Prince Chun, line of Yunyou

Prince Lian of the First Rank

Line of Yuntang

Prince Dun of the Second Rank

Prince Lü of the First Rank

Prince Yi of the First Rank

Prince Xun of the Second Rank

Prince Yu of the Second Rank

Prince Jianjing of the Third Rank

Prince Zhi of the First Rank

Prince Gongqin of the Third Rank

Prince Cheng of the Third Rank

Prince Xian of the First Rank

Sons of the Qianlong Emperor

Prince Ding of the First Rank

Prince Xun of the Second Rank

Prince Rong of the First Rank

Prince Yi of the First Rank

Prince Cheng of the First Rank

Prince Qing of the First Rank

Sons of the Jiaqing Emperor

Prince Rui of the First Rank

Prince Hui of the First Rank

Sons of the Daoguang Emperor

Prince Chun of the First Rank

Prince Zhong of the Second Rank

Prince Fu of the Second Rank

See also 

 Royal and noble ranks of the Qing dynasty

References 

 
Chinese royal titles